Felipe Vaqueriza Rodríguez (born 23 January 1975, in Madrid) is a Spanish retired footballer who played as a central defender.

Honours
Spain U17
FIFA U-17 World Cup: Runner-up 1991

External links
 
 

1975 births
Living people
Footballers from Madrid
Spanish footballers
Association football defenders
Segunda División players
Segunda División B players
Tercera División players
Real Madrid C footballers
Real Madrid Castilla footballers
RCD Mallorca B players
Real Murcia players
Gimnàstic de Tarragona footballers
Spain youth international footballers
Spain under-23 international footballers